The team jumping was one of five equestrianism events on the Equestrian at the 1924 Summer Olympics programme. Scores were the sum of the individual scores for the best three riders of each nation's four-man team. The competition was held on Saturday 27 July 1924. 43 riders from 11 nations competed. Czechoslovakia, with only three individual entrants, was the only nation to not send a full team.

Results

The scores of riders in italics (the fourth-best rider on each team as well as non-finishers) were not counted.

References

Sources
 

Jumping team